Suzanne Ridgeway (born Suzanne Parsons; January 27, 1918May 6, 1996) was an American film actress who appeared in approximately 115 films between 1933 and 1959. She was most often credited as Suzanne Ridgway. Other billings included Suzy Marquette and Susan Ridgway.

Career
Born as Suzanne Parsons, Ridgeway is familiar to modern viewers as the tall, lanky brunette in several Three Stooges short subjects such as Rumpus in the Harem, A Missed Fortune, and A Merry Mix Up.  She was also in Outpost in Morocco (1949).

Death
Ridgeway died on May 6, 1996, in Burbank, California.

Selected filmography
 The Steel Lady (1953)
 Around the World in 80 Days (1956)
 From Hell It Came (1957)

References

External links

1918 births
1996 deaths
20th-century American actresses
Actresses from California
American film actresses
People from Greater Los Angeles